Mississippi Mills may refer to:

Mississippi Mills, Ontario, a town in Ontario, Canada
Mississippi Mills (Wesson, Mississippi), a historic textile mill in Wesson, Mississippi